Ilya Valeryevich Yashin (born 29 June 1983) is a Russian opposition politician who led the PARNAS party from 2012 to 2016, and then its Moscow branch. He was also head of the Moscow municipal district of Krasnoselsky and former chairman of the Council of Deputies of the Krasnoselsky district from 2017 to 2021. 

Yashin co-founded the civic youth movement Oborona in 2005 and later the political movement Solidarnost in 2008, of which he is still one of the leaders. He was an active participant in the Dissenters' March and the 2011–2013 Russian protests. In 2012, he was elected to the Russian Opposition Coordination Council. Amidst an increase in government crackdowns on the opposition following the 2022 Russian invasion of Ukraine, some considered Yashin to have had the largest platform of any opposition politician that had not either left the country, been imprisoned, or been killed. However, in June 2022, he was arrested, and later accused under the new war censorship laws of disseminating fake news about the Armed Forces. In December 2022, he was sentenced to eight-and-a-half years in prison.

Biography

Early life and education
Ilya Yashin was born in a Russian family, in Moscow on July 29, 1983. He graduated from International Independent University of Environmental and Political Sciences, the Faculty of Political Science, in 2005.

Political career
He served as the leader of the Yabloko party's youth wing since 2001 until 2008, organizing mass protests and speaking to the media about their causes. However, when he became an active member of Solidarnost in 2008, Yabloko expelled him for "causing political damage".

Yashin was running for Moscow parliament in 2005.

Yashin is known for making passionate speeches at opposition rallies. He is an active participant in the Strategy-31 campaign for freedom of assembly. In 2005, he spoke against the Nashi movement, which supports President Vladimir Putin.

On 31 December 2010, Yashin was arrested for demonstrating in Moscow at another rally for Strategy-31. He was taken to a police station and detained for fifteen days. He claims evidence was then fabricated against him by the police. Amnesty International declared him a prisoner of conscience, along with Boris Nemtsov and Konstantin Kosiakin.

Following the alleged kidnapping and torture of opposition activist Leonid Razvozzhayev, from Kyiv, Ukraine, Yashin was arrested on 27 October 2012 along with Sergei Udaltsov and Alexei Navalny while attempting to join a Moscow protest on Razvozzhayev's behalf. The three were charged with violating public order, for which they could be fined up to 30,000 rubles (US$1,000) or given 50 hours of community service.

On 23 February 2016 Yashin, despite harassment by police and hecklers, presented a report criticizing Chechen leader Ramzan Kadyrov, labeling him a danger to Russian national security and called for his resignation. The report highlighted Kadyrov's encouragement of violence against opposition activists and federal law enforcement officials, his luxurious lifestyle and corruption, and the building of a personal army.

Moscow municipal deputy

On 10 September 2017 Yashin was elected a municipal deputy of the Krasnoselsky district of Moscow. The Solidarnost team won 7 out of 10 seats in this district (the United Russia won the other 3). On 25 September 2017 he took the office. On 7 October 2017 Ilya Yashin was elected a chairman of the council of deputies of Krasnoselsky municipal district of Moscow.

On 11 April 2018 Yashin announced his intention to run in the election for Moscow mayor's office and beat the incumbent Sergey Sobyanin.

On 25 June 2021, he was barred from running in the upcoming legislative election after being considered an "extremist". He reported that he considered it was due to his support for Alexei Navalny.

In March 2022, Yashin publicly condemned the Russian invasion of Ukraine.

Arrest and imprisonment
On 27 June 2022, Ilya Yashin was detained in Moscow by local police. On 28 June, Yashin was sentenced to 15 days in detention for disobeying a police officer. Yashin called the case politically motivated and intended to suppress his political stance towards the war in Ukraine.

On 12 July, Yashin was accused by the Investigative Committee of Russia of discrediting the Russian Armed Forces and his home was searched. On 13 July, a court ordered his pretrial detention; Amnesty International and other organisations called on the government to release him immediately, regarding his case as part of repressions on war critics.

On 9 December, a Moscow court sentenced Yashin to eight years and six months imprisonment for his statements about the circumstances of the killings in Bucha on charges of "spreading false information" about the armed forces. Yashin condemned the killings in Bucha and said that Russian forces in Ukraine were responsible for the massacre. His punishment was the harshest given under the new laws which criminalize spreading "false" information about the armed forces. In his closing remarks to the court ahead of the verdict, Yashin said: "As if they will sew my mouth shut and I would be forbidden to speak forever. Everyone understands that this is the point. I am isolated from society because they want me to be silent. I promise as long as I’m alive I’ll never will be. My mission is to tell the truth. I will not give up the truth even behind bars. After all, quoting the classic: 'Lie is the religion of slaves.'" 

Yashin said about Russian President Vladimir Putin that "Strong leaders are calm and self-confident, and only weaklings seek to shut everyone up, burn out any dissent."

Electoral history

See also
Putin. War

References

Literature
 Mickiewicz E. No Illusions: The Voices of Russia's Future Leaders. — Oxford University Press, 2014. — P. 198. — 288 p. — . — .
 Putin's Opponents: Enemies of the People / The Associated Press. — Mango Media, 2015. — 198 p. — . — .
 Bennetts M. I'm Going to Ruin Their Lives: Inside Putin's War on Russia's Opposition. — Oneworld Publications, 2016. — P. 99—101, 105, 149. — 320 p. — . — .
 Lyytikainen L. Performing Political Opposition in Russia: The Case of the Youth Group Oborona. — Routledge, 2016. — 202 p. — (The Mobilization Series on Social Movements, Protest, and Culture). — . — .

External links
Yashin's blog
Yashin's page on the Solidarity website
Yashin's page on the Yabloko website

1983 births
Living people
Politicians from Moscow
People's Freedom Party politicians
Solidarnost politicians
21st-century Russian politicians
Yabloko politicians
2011–2013 Russian protests
Russian dissidents
Amnesty International prisoners of conscience held by Russia
European Court of Human Rights cases involving Russia
Russian prisoners and detainees
Russian YouTubers
Russian activists against the 2022 Russian invasion of Ukraine
People listed in Russia as foreign agents